Alexander Damascene (died 14 July 1719), born in France, was a singer and composer in England.

Life
Damascene was of Italian origin. He was a Protestant, and probably for this reason he came to England from France; he obtained letters of naturalisation in July 1682. He gained a livelihood as an alto singer and teacher of music. On 6 December 1690 he was appointed gentleman-extraordinary of the Chapel Royal; on 10 December 1695, three weeks after the death of Henry Purcell, he succeeded him as gentleman-in-ordinary.

He sang at the coronation of William and Mary in 1689, and he sang at the coronation of Queen Anne in 1702.

In 1680 he married Honor Powell. He lived (as stated in his will) in the Parish of St Anne's in London. He died on 14 July 1719, and was buried at St Anne's Church, Soho.

Compositions
Damascene composed numerous songs, many of which were published in the various musical miscellanies of the day, such as Choice Ayres and Songs, 1676–84; The Theatre of Musick, 1685–7; Vinculum Societatis, 1687–91; The Banquet of Musick, 1688–92; Comes Amoris, 1687–94; and The Gentleman's Journal, 1692–4.

References

Attribution
 

17th-century births
1719 deaths
French emigrants to England
17th-century male singers
18th-century male singers
17th-century composers
18th-century composers
Burials at St Anne's Church, Soho